Marar, (IAST:Mārār), is the name given to the caste of hereditary temple musicians of Travancore, Cochin and Malabar region in the state of Kerala, whose primary duty was to provide the traditional temple Sopanam music. .They live in the vicinity of temples; and are related with the temples and temple customs. They belong to ambalavasi caste (Forward caste). Marar ladies are called Marasyar. 

Paani, the indispensable part of high tantric rituals of temple such as ulsavabali, sreeboothabali etc. is  another main hereditory temple profession of marar. They were also known for their playing of chenda (valam thala represents deva vadyam (usually play inside the nalambalam) and edam thala reprasents asura vadyam) and idakka (deva vadyam) in temples . Sopanadwani is the monthly publication of Akhila Kerala Marar Kshema Sabha. Marars were considered as antharala jathikal (between brahmin and Sudra)

Customs and Temple arts

See also
Ambalavasi

References

Performers of Hindu music
Social groups of Kerala
Musician castes